Pseudostichopus is a genus of sea cucumbers belonging to the monotypic family Pseudostichopodidae. The genus has a cosmopolitan distribution.

Species
The following species are recognised in the genus Pseudostichopus:
Pseudostichopus aemulatus Solis-Marin & Billett in Solis-Marin et al., 2004
Pseudostichopus echinatus Thandar, 1992
Pseudostichopus elegans (Koehler & Vaney, 1905)
Pseudostichopus hyalegerus (Sluiter, 1901)
Pseudostichopus langeae Thandar, 2009
Pseudostichopus mollis Théel, 1886
Pseudostichopus occultatus Marenzeller von, 1893
Pseudostichopus papillatus (D'yakonov, 1949)
Pseudostichopus peripatus (Sluiter, 1901)
Pseudostichopus profundi D'yakonov, 1949
Pseudostichopus spiculiferus (O'Loughlin, 2002)
Pseudostichopus tuberosus O'Loughlin & Ahearn, 2005

References

Persiculida
Holothuroidea genera